is a Japanese manga written and illustrated by Naoto Iwakiri. The original name of this manga is  but, it has been serialized in cakes website as Oshiete Hokusai! from August 9, 2016, to February 7, 2017, and has been collected in single tankōbon volume. This single volume manga was published by Sunmark Publishing on June 30, 2017. A short original net animation (ONA) series adaptation by CoMix Wave Films premiered from March 7, 2021, to March 14, 2021.

Characters

Media

Manga

Anime 
On November 7, 2020, it was announced that Teach Me, Hokusai! would receive an original net animation series adaptation. This anime series is produced by Japanese studio CoMix Wave Films who also produced popular films Your Name and Weathering with You. Directed by Naoto Iwakari who also wrote the manga of this title and Sou Matsumoto is the producer. Series composition by Hayato Morohashi, character design and key animation by Yuusuke Itou. Haru Yamada directed the sound and sound work by Sound Team Don Juan. Sound effects by Naoto Yamatani. Shingo Nishimura composed the music. Tokin directed the original art and background art, script or screenplay written by Natsu Hashimoto. Production generalisation by Yuuchi Sakai and photography by Norihisa Nakama. bilibili is streaming this anime on Mainland China, South Asia and Southeast Asian territories.

The opening theme song of this anime is "Tenkorin no Theme (The Theme of Tenkorin)" by CHAI featuring Tenkorin Okakura (CV: Azumi Waki) and Raijin (CV: Katsuyuki Konishi). And the ending theme song is "Oshiete Hokusai! (Teach Me, Hokusai!)" by Kami Suzuki Brothers (P.O.P) and YMCK.

Notes

References

External links 
 Anime official website 
 Official Twitter 
 

2016 manga
2021 anime ONAs
Anime series based on manga
Slice of life anime and manga
CoMix Wave Films films